Nominal group may refer to:
 Nominal group, alias for nominal category in statistics
 Nominal group (functional grammar)
 Nominal group technique, group decision-making technique